Howard Winfield Robison (October 30, 1915 – September 26, 1987) was a Republican member of the United States House of Representatives from New York.

Robison was born in Owego, New York. He graduated from Cornell University in 1937 and received a law degree from Cornell Law School in 1939. He served in the Counter Intelligence Corps of the United States Army from 1942 until 1946. His training at Camp Ritchie in Maryland puts him among the ranks of the Ritchie Boys. He served as county attorney of Tioga County, New York from 1946 until 1958. He was elected to Congress in 1958 in a special election to fill the vacancy caused by the resignation of W. Sterling Cole and served from January 14, 1958, until January 3, 1975. Robison voted in favor of the Civil Rights Acts of 1960, 1964, and 1968, as well as the 24th Amendment to the U.S. Constitution and the Voting Rights Act of 1965.

References

Sources

1915 births
1987 deaths
Cornell Law School alumni
Republican Party members of the United States House of Representatives from New York (state)
20th-century American politicians
Ritchie Boys